Clifford the Big Red Dog is an animated educational children's television series, based upon Norman Bridwell's children's book series of the same name. Produced by Scholastic Productions, it originally aired on PBS Kids from September 4, 2000, to February 25, 2003. A UK version (dubbed with British voice actors replacing the original American soundtrack) originally aired on BBC Two in April 2002.

Internationally, German-based TV-Loonland AG handled broadcast rights to the series, while Entertainment Rights held merchandising and home media rights.

John Ritter voices Clifford in every episode. By the time the series ended production and the subsequent film Clifford's Really Big Movie were completed, Ritter was back on ABC's prime time schedule, starring in 8 Simple Rules. Ritter's death on September 11, 2003, came less than two weeks before the debut of Clifford's Puppy Days (it is often mistakenly cited as the reason the spin-off was created in lieu of a third season).

Though production of Clifford ended before Ritter's death, voice actors for the main characters have reprised some of their roles for the Ready to Learn PBS Kids PSAs. Clifford's Really Big Movie served as the series finale, Clifford's Puppy Days still continued to air until its cancellation in 2006.

On May 16, 2018, Scholastic announced a reboot of the series of the same name, which was released on December 6, 2019, on Amazon Prime Video and December 7, 2019, on PBS Kids, starring Adam Sanders as the new voice of Clifford. PBS Kids continued to air reruns of the 2000 series until 2022. Select PBS member stations still continue to carry the show.

As of 2021, the show is currently distributed worldwide by 9 Story Media Group.

Overview
Two stories made up each half-hour episode. Usually one story featured Clifford and his canine friends, Cleo, T-Bone and Mac among them; the other story would focus on Clifford's owner, Emily Elizabeth and her friends, Jetta, Vaz and Charley. During scenes focusing on the dogs' perspective, human speech would replace barking to show the storyline from the dogs' point of view.

Characters

Humans
Emily-Elizabeth Howard (voiced by Grey DeLisle Griffin in the US version and Joanna Ruiz in the UK version) is Clifford's 8-year-old owner. Emily-Elizabeth adopted Clifford when he was a very small puppy, when her parents gave him to her on her 6th birthday. Emily-Elizabeth's love apparently caused Clifford to grow enormous, thus starting their new lives on Birdwell Island. Emily-Elizabeth was named for creator Norman Bridwell's daughter and based on the imaginary adventures of Bridwell's wife.
Caroline Howard (also voiced by Grey DeLisle Griffin) is Emily-Elizabeth's mother and the wife of Mark Howard. She owns and works at The Sea Shell, which is a small store on Birdwell Island.
Mark Howard  (voiced by Cam Clarke) is Emily-Elizabeth's father and the husband of Caroline Howard.
Charley (voiced by Gary LeRoi Gray) is Jamaican American who is Emily-Elizabeth's friend. He lives on a houseboat with his father, who owns a restaurant.
Samuel (voiced by Terrence C. Carson) is Charley's father and the Jamaican owner of Samuel's Fish and Chips. He runs most of the pier.
Jetta Handover (voiced by Kath Soucie) is Mac's owner. She is a friend of Emily-Elizabeth and tends to be snobby towards others. Soucie also voiced Jetta's mother who owns one of the island stores. She often wears her sweater as a poncho. She is Cosmo's big sister.
Cosmo Handover (voiced by Debi Derryberry) is the infant brother of Jetta. He is first seen in the episode "Baby Makes 4".
Vaz (voiced by Ulysses Cuadra) is a Spanish American boy who is friends with Emily-Elizabeth and Charley.
Sheriff Lewis (voiced by Nick Jameson) is T-Bone's owner. The island's sheriff and the soccer coach.
Mrs. Diller (voiced by Cree Summer) is Cleo's owner.
Horace Bleakman (voiced by Earl Boen) is Violet's husband. Generally referred to as 'Mr. Bleakman', he has strong on-and-off dislike towards Clifford and other dogs but sometimes shows sympathy for his neighbors and their pets. 
Violet Bleakman (voiced by Edie McClurg) is the first neighbor of the Howards to introduce herself and Horace's wife, generally known as Mrs. Bleakman.
Mary (also voiced by Kath Soucie) is Emily-Elizabeth's friend who sits in a wheelchair due to her disability of walking and standing up. She plays piano. 
Dan (voiced by Susan Blu) is one of Emily-Elizabeth's classmates.
Laura Howard (voiced by E. G. Daily) is Emily-Elizabeth's cousin who owns a dog named Rex. 
Miss. Carrington (voiced by Grey Griffin) is the schoolteacher on Birdwell Island. 
Monique (voiced by Simbi Khali) is Jetta's friend.
Victor and Pedro (both voiced by Tony Plana) work at the ferry dock.
Ms. Lee (voiced by Haunani Minn) is the librarian at the Birdwell Island Library.
Dr. Dihn (also voiced by Haunani Minn) is the island's vet. She later adopts a dog named Bob.

Animals
Gordo (voiced by Frank Welker) is an Indian elephant that catches a cold but performs well with Clifford in one episode.
 Welker had also voiced Boomer, a brown capuchin monkey who performs in the circus with Gordo.

Dogs
Clifford (voiced by John Ritter in the US version and Tom Eastwood in the UK version) is a big red Labrador Retriever. The character is based on the imaginary friend of creator Norman Bridwell's wife. His owner is Emily-Elizabeth Howard. Although his tremendous height sometimes tends to get him in trouble with others, Clifford means no harm and is very friendly to everyone.
Cleo (also voiced by Cree Summer in the US version and Regine Candler in the UK version) is a purple female poodle. Her owner is Mrs. Diller, but she mainly spends the day with her friends Clifford and T-Bone. Her catchphrase is "Have I ever steered you wrong?" and when the dogs would reminisce on a time that happened, she interrupts them in mid-sentence. She strongly dislikes baths.
T-Bone (voiced by Kel Mitchell in the US version and Benjamin Small in the UK version) is a yellow male bulldog. His owner is Sheriff Lewis, but he mainly spends the day with his friends Clifford and Cleo. He is afraid of fireworks.
T-Bone once had a friend named Hamburger (voiced by Kel Mitchell's longtime comedy partner Kenan Thompson) who moved away before Clifford arrived.
Mac (also voiced by Cam Clarke) is a blue male greyhound. It is revealed in a few episodes that his name is short for Machiavelli. His owner is Jetta Handover; much like his owner, Mac tends to be snobby towards his friends.
K.C. (also voiced by Cam Clarke) is a male beagle who only walks on three legs. He is one of Clifford's, Cleo's and T-Bone's best friends.
Mimi (voiced by Tyisha Hampton) is a female poodle and T-Bone's love interest who occasionally visits Birdwell Island.
Rex (voiced by Frank Welker) is Clifford's friend from the time when he was still a puppy.
Manny (voiced by Frank Welker) is an elderly schnauzer who appears in some episodes from time to time.
Kiki (voiced by Gabrielle Carteris) is Cleo's playful niece.
Bob (voiced by Debi Derryberry) is Dr. Dinh's rambunctious dachshund.
Tonya (voiced by Maria Canals) is a beautiful orange and white female collie.

Cats
Betty (voiced by Debi Derryberry) is a playful yellow cat and sister of Billy.
Billy (voiced by Susan Blu) is a playful orange cat and brother of Betty.

Episodes

Production
The series was produced by Mike Young Productions and Scholastic Studios with animation produced by Hong Ying Universe Company Limited in Taipei, Taiwan and Hosem Animation Studio, a Shanghai-based outlet in China who did the uncredited work.

Setting

The TV series takes place in the fictional island of Birdwell Island, where Clifford lives. The name is inspired by Norman Bridwell, the author of the books, but the letters I and R are switched. Birdwell Island was inspired by Martha's Vineyard in Massachusetts, where Bridwell lived.

Emily Elizabeth used to live in an apartment in New York City, but she moved away with her parents and Clifford to Birdwell Island because Caroline told her that a small apartment is no place for a big dog like Clifford.

Format
The series has at least 4 segments in the show.

 First story: The opening theme is followed by the first central story, which is usually about the dogs, and a problem they face.
 Storytime with Speckle: Between the first and second story, Emily Elizabeth reads Clifford a short story about a dog named Speckle, and his animal friends.
 Second story: Another central story, usually about Emily Elizabeth and her friends.
 Clifford's Big Ideas: Another 30-second short, which demonstrates a moral lesson such as "Play Fair" or "Help Others", with narration by Emily Elizabeth. 
Live action segments starring real kids and their dogs.

In the UK version, only one story is shown, with either the Storytime with Speckle or the Clifford's Big Ideas segments at the end, shortening the show to about 15 minutes.

Reception 
Clifford the Big Red Dog has received generally positive reviews from television critics and parents of young children. Lynne Heffley of Los Angeles Times wrote," Clifford: The Big Red Dog focuses on positive messages with a fantasy approach. Based on the classic children's books by Norman Bridwell, this animated series is about a red dog who is the size of a jumbo jet to match the outsized love that his owner, a little girl named Emily, has for him."

International broadcast
Clifford the Big Red Dog was shown on CBeebies and Tiny Pop in the United Kingdom, and in Latin America on Discovery Kids. It aired in the Republic of Ireland on TG4 from 6 February 2001. It aired in Australia on Nine and in New Zealand on TV2.

2019 reboot

On May 16, 2018, Scholastic announced a reboot of the series, which premiered on December 6, 2019, for both Amazon Prime Video and PBS Kids. Scholastic, 100 Chickens, 9 Story Media Group and Brown Bag Films produce the series. Excepting Clifford, Emily Elizabeth and Birdwell Island, the new series is a complete departure from the predecessor show's character base.

In other media

Direct-to-video
In 1988, before the television series, six direct-to-video episodes based on the Clifford series (Clifford's Fun with Letters, Clifford's Fun with Sounds, Clifford's Fun with Rhymes, Clifford's Fun with Opposites, Clifford's Fun with Numbers and Clifford's Fun with Shapes) were produced by Nelvana Limited for Scholastic Media, and  released on videocassette by Family Home Entertainment. Brent Titcomb voiced Clifford and Alyson Court voiced Emily Elizabeth.

Film
In 2004, Warner Bros. Pictures distributed a feature-length animated film based on the show, Clifford's Really Big Movie. In the film, Clifford, Cleo and T-Bone join an animal show to win a lifetime supply of dog food to provide for Clifford. This was one of John Ritter's last films as he died on September 11, 2003, after completing voice work for the film. Clifford's Really Big Movie was released posthomously and dedicated to his memory. The movie also stars Wayne Brady as Shackleford the Ferret, Judge Reinhold as Amazing Larry, John Goodman as George Wolfsbottom, and Jenna Elfman as Dorothy the Cow. The film also serves as the series finale, as no new episodes were produced after the film was released, until the reboot premiered on PBS Kids in 2019.

Video games

Original series
Clifford's Reading
Clifford's Thinking Adventures

Modern series
Clifford's Learning Activities
Clifford's Musical Memory Games
Clifford's Phonics
Clifford's Big Puzzle Game (A Wendy's Kids' Meal DVD game, available for a limited time only)

Sponsors
 Kix (2000-2003)
 Chuck E. Cheese's (2001-2012)
 Milton Bradley (2002)
 Lipton (2003-2005)
 Danimals (2003-2006)
 Buffets, Inc. (2013)

References

External links

 

Official site

2000 American television series debuts
2003 American television series endings
2000s American animated television series
2000 British television series debuts
2003 British television series endings
2000s British animated television series
American children's animated comedy television series
British children's animated comedy television series
Animated preschool education television series
Animated television series about children
Animated television series about dogs
American preschool education television series
American television shows based on children's books
American television series with live action and animation
British preschool education television series
British television shows based on children's books
British television series with live action and animation
2000s preschool education television series
Elementary school television series
BBC children's television shows
English-language television shows
PBS Kids shows
CBC Television original programming
Television series about size change
Television series by Splash Entertainment
Television series set on fictional islands
Clifford the Big Red Dog
Reading and literacy television series
PBS original programming
CBeebies